The Short Shetland was a British high-speed, long-range, four-engined flying boat built by Short Brothers at Rochester, Kent for use in the Second World War. It was designed to meet an Air Ministry requirement (defined in Specification R.14/40) for a very-long range reconnaissance flying boat. The design used the company's experience with large scale production of the Short Sunderland. The end of World War II prevented the Shetland from entering production. It was the first aircraft designed with a 110 volt electrical system.

Design and development
Specification R.14/40 replaced an earlier specification R.5/39 which was an up-armed revision of specification R.3/38 for a faster flying boat than the Short Sunderland. Shorts, among others, had tendered a design for R.5/39 but the ministry had changed its mind about the need for an immediate replacement for the Sunderland. R.5/39 had considered a maximum weight up to 84,000 lb (38,102 kg) – R.14/40 allowed for a maximum takeoff of nearly 100,000 lb (45,359 kg) with a bomb load of 20,000 lb (9,072 kg). The projected engines were the Bristol Centaurus radial or the Napier Sabre inline.

Shorts and the other British manufacturer of big flying boats, Saunders-Roe (Saro), were involved in the competitive tender for R.14/40; Saro proposed the Saunders-Roe S.41. Rather than selecting either company's design, the Air Ministry asked the companies to submit a combined project, stipulating the terms under which the work was to be shared between them. The detailed design was performed by Saro, its experience with the Saro Shrimp contributing to the hull shape, as well as building the wing. Shorts built the hull, tail and the final assembly.

Variants

Short S.35 Shetland I
The first prototype and what was to be the only Shetland I (Serial Number DX166) first flew on 14 December 1944, piloted by Shorts' chief test pilot John Lankester Parker as captain and Geoffrey Tyson as co-pilot. The aircraft flew without gun turrets (its role having been revised to that of unarmed transport before its maiden flight. It was delivered to the Marine Aircraft Experimental Establishment (MAEE) at Felixstowe in October 1945. Testing indicated satisfactory water handling but the stabilising floats were mounted too low and did not offer sufficient clearance for takeoffs with maximum load. Flight testing revealed problems with the harmonisation of controls and marginal longitudinal stability. Before the trials were complete, the aircraft burnt out at its moorings on 28 January 1946 as a result of a galley fire.

Short S.40 Shetland II
With the end of the war, the second prototype (Serial Number DX171) was completed as a civil transport and designated Shetland II. It was designed to carry 70 passengers but only 40 seats were fitted. Registered G-AGVD, the Shetland Mk.II's first flight took place on 17 September 1947. After trials, it was delivered to Short's factory at Belfast, but no orders were forthcoming and it performed only limited flight trials before being scrapped in 1951.

Specifications (S.35)

See also

References

Notes

Bibliography

External links
 Plans of Prototype 1 and civil version (1946)
 Pictures gallery
 Short Shetland – British Aircraft of World War II

1940s British experimental aircraft
1940s British patrol aircraft
Shetland
Flying boats
Four-engined tractor aircraft
High-wing aircraft
Aircraft first flown in 1944